"Back in Your Arms Again" is a song written by Paul Davis and J. Fred Knobloch, and recorded by American country music artist Lorrie Morgan.  It was released in August 1995 as the second single from her Greatest Hits compilation album.  The song reached #4 on the Billboard Hot Country Singles & Tracks chart in November 1995.

Chart performance

References

1995 singles
1995 songs
Lorrie Morgan songs
Songs written by Paul Davis (singer)
Songs written by J. Fred Knobloch
Song recordings produced by James Stroud
BNA Records singles